The Conservation Volunteers (TCV) is a British community volunteering charity focused on environmental conservation through practical tasks undertaken by volunteers. Until 1 May 2012, it traded as BTCV – British Trust for Conservation Volunteers).

History

The Conservation Corps
In 1959 the (then) Council for Nature appointed Brigadier Armstrong to form the Conservation Corps, with the objective of involving young volunteers, over the age of 16, in practical conservation work. The corp's first project was at Box Hill, Surrey, where 42 volunteers cleared dogwood to encourage the growth of juniper and distinctive chalk downland flora. One of the volunteers present was David Bellamy, who went on to become a Vice President of BTCV.

By 1964 the Conservation Corps had expanded its activities to include education and amenity work in the countryside. In 1966 it moved from a basement office at Queens Gate, Kensington, to new premises at London Zoo in Regent's Park. In 1968 the first training course for volunteers was held. By 1969 membership had increased to 600, and volunteers completed around 6,000 workdays a year. The first ever international exchange visit to Czechoslovakia that year became the forerunner for the International Project Programme of today.

The British Trust for Conservation Volunteers
In 1970 the Conservation Corps started to operate under the new name of British Trust for Conservation Volunteers (BTCV), with Prince Philip as Patron. In 1971 the local group affiliation scheme was launched.
 In 1972 the Conserver magazine was launched.
 By 1974 there were 3,000 registered volunteers and 57 groups had registered with BTCV.
 In 1975 the BTCV Membership scheme was started
 In 1977 BTCV set up an ecological park opposite the Tower of London as part of the Queen's Silver Jubilee celebrations.
 In 1984 BTCV moved its headquarters to Wallingford, Oxfordshire.

BTCV
The organisation underwent a second change of identity in 2000, taking the initialism BTCV as its new name in full. 
 In August 2006 BTCV moved to its present headquarters in Doncaster. The new "environmentally friendly" building features a sedum-covered roof – hence its name – Sedum House. The Scottish office is in Stirling and the Northern Ireland office in Belfast.

The Conservation Volunteers

In May 2012, BTCV rebranded under the trading name The Conservation Volunteers (TCV).

At the group's annual general meeting in November 2012 the members of The Conservation Volunteers voted unanimously to change formally the name of the charity to The Conservation Volunteers.

See also
 Green Gym
 Trust for Urban Ecology

References

External links
 The Conservation Volunteers website
 
 

Environmental organisations based in the United Kingdom
Nature conservation organisations based in the United Kingdom
Charities based in South Yorkshire
Environmental organizations established in 1970
1959 establishments in the United Kingdom